Mikhail Filima (born 17 November 1982) is a Ukrainian tennis coach and professional player.

Biography
Born in Kiev, Filima was a right-handed player and featured in five Davis Cup ties for Ukraine across 2004 and 2005. His Davis Cup career included a singles win over Jan Frode Andersen, where he came from two sets down to defeat his better ranked Norwegian opponent and secure the tie for Ukraine.

Filima played briefly at ATP Challenger level, with his best singles performance a semi-final appearance at Donetsk in 2005. At the same tournament he partnered with Davis Cup teammate Orest Tereshchuk to win the doubles event. He won a further seven doubles tournament on the ITF circuit.

Since 2016 he has been captain of the Ukraine Fed Cup team. He previously captained the Davis Cup team, which he led to the World Group play-offs on three occasions.

Challenger titles

Doubles: (1)

References

External links
 
 
 

1982 births
Living people
Ukrainian male tennis players
Sportspeople from Kyiv